Jacqueline Delord (born 29 January 1970) is a French former swimmer who competed in the 1988 Summer Olympics, in the 1992 Summer Olympics, and in the 1996 Summer Olympics.

References

1970 births
Living people
French female freestyle swimmers
French female butterfly swimmers
Olympic swimmers of France
Swimmers at the 1988 Summer Olympics
Swimmers at the 1992 Summer Olympics
Swimmers at the 1996 Summer Olympics
Mediterranean Games gold medalists for France
Mediterranean Games medalists in swimming
Swimmers at the 1987 Mediterranean Games
20th-century French women
21st-century French women